The Busher is a 1919 American drama film directed by Jerome Storm featuring Colleen Moore, and produced by Thomas H. Ince. The film still exists and is available on DVD from Kino Video, running 55 minutes. There is an alternate edition available from Grapevine Video. This version runs 63 minutes, including a longer opening exposition sequence, and more frequent original intertitles, which help to clarify the story. A print is also held by Gosfilmofond Russian State Archives.

Story 
When the train transporting the St. Paul Pink Sox is delayed outside of Brownsville, the players exit the train for some exercise and end up playing a game with the locals. The manager is impressed with Ben Harding, inexperienced but talented pitcher for the Brownsville baseball team. Ben joins the team and leaves for the big city, promising his sweetheart Mazie Palmer that he will return for her.

However, success goes to his head and he forgets about his small-town roots. He ignores the hometown folk, including Mazie, when they come to the big city to see him play. Because he lives the fancy life, his pitching suffers and soon he is sent back home in shame. Ben vows never to play ball again, but discovering that Mazie's brother has bet their house on the championship game, with the home team behind, Ben returns to the mound, wins the game, the respect of the town, the love of Mazie, and a new contract from a Pink Sox representative who had been waiting for Ben to lose his conceit.

Cast

Details 
Colleen Moore plays the girlfriend of a baseball player who hits the big time and forgets about his roots. The rival for Colleen's affections was played by Jack Gilbert, who would later gain fame as actor John Gilbert.

Bibliography 
 Codori, Jeff (2012), Colleen Moore: A Biography of the Silent Film Star, McFarland Publishing, (Print , EBook ).

External links 

 
 The Busher at TCM Database

1919 films
American silent feature films
Films directed by Jerome Storm
American baseball films
1910s sports drama films
American black-and-white films
American sports drama films
1919 drama films
1910s American films
Silent American drama films
1910s English-language films
Silent sports drama films